Roy Hollandsworth was a Republican member of the Montana Legislature. In 2008, he was elected to House District 28 which represents the Gallatin County area. After the 2010 census he was reassigned to District 27.

References

Living people
Republican Party members of the Montana House of Representatives
1942 births
Place of birth missing (living people)
Date of birth missing (living people)